The 12 cantons (  or  ;) of the Grand Duchy of Luxembourg are areas of local government at the first level of local administrative unit (LAU-1) in the European Union's Nomenclature of Territorial Units for Statistics for Eurostat purposes. They were subdivisions of the three districts of Luxembourg until 2015, when the district level of government was abolished. The cantons are in turn subdivided into 102 communes (i.e. municipalities).

List
The following list gives the names of the cantons in French and Luxembourgish (in that order) which are both official languages of the Grand Duchy of Luxembourg:

See also
 :Category:Lists of cantons of Luxembourg
 ISO 3166-2:LU

References

External links
 

 
Subdivisions of Luxembourg
Luxembourg 2
Cantons, Luxembourg
 Cantons